Bokenäs Old Church (Swedish: Bokenäs gamla kyrka) is a medieval era church at Bokenäs in  Uddevalla Municipality in Västra Götaland County, Sweden.

History
It is now part of Bokenäs assembly, after Bokenäs and several other local parishes were merged in 2010. One of the most well-preserved medieval churches in Bohuslän, it was founded at some point in the early 12th century, and has been in use since. Except for parts of the interior, the weaponhouse from the 17th century, and the tower from 1752, most of the church is original. The altar, baptismal font and pulpit are from the 1770s. Interior paintings were made in 1770 by Johan Henric Dieden (1732-1817) from Uddevalla.

The church underwent restoration from 1974 to 1976 under the direction of architect Arne Nygård (1925-2014).
The church is open to the public daily during the summer, and for pre-arranged visits during the rest of the year due to maintenance costs.

Gallery

References

External links
Bokenäs gamla kyrka website

Churches in Bohuslän
12th-century churches in Sweden
Churches in the Diocese of Gothenburg
Churches converted from the Roman Catholic Church to the Church of Sweden